Jacob Shmuel Boteach (born November 19, 1966) is an American Orthodox Jewish rabbi, author, and television host. Boteach is the author of 31 books, including the best seller Kosher Sex: A Recipe for Passion and Intimacy, and Kosher Jesus. For two seasons he hosted the prime time television series Shalom in the Home, which was one of TLC's highest-rated shows. His outspokenness has earned him praise and criticism.  The Washington Post referred to him as "the most famous rabbi in America", Newsweek named him one of the 10 most influential rabbis in the United States, and The Jerusalem Post named him one of the 50 most influential Jews in the world.

Early and personal life
Boteach was born in Los Angeles, California. He grew up there and in Miami, Florida, and was raised in a Modern Orthodox Jewish home. He was the youngest of five children. His father Yoav Botach (without the "e") had been born the second child in a family of 13 in Iran in 1937, and grew up a Jewish boy fighting local Muslim anti-semites; he later lived in Israel, before coming to the United States. Boteach's  mother Eleanor was an American tourist when she met his father in Israel. Boteach's parents divorced when he was eight years old; for his bar mitzvah present, he told his parents that he wanted them to reunite.

He attended a Chabad (Lubavitch) camp, and fell in love with Judaism.  The Lubavitcher Rebbe became his patron, and at age 13 Boteach joined the Chabad movement (a Hasidic philosophy that traces back 250 years to Lubavitch, Russia). At age 14, he decided he wanted to become a rabbi, to help heartbroken people. He studied at Rabbi Alexander S. Gross Hebrew Academy and at a series of yeshivas in Los Angeles, New York, and Jerusalem, Israel (for three years at Torat Emet Yeshiva).

Boteach was ultimately chosen to be one of ten Chabad students sent to Sydney, Australia, to start a yeshiva. In Sydney he met the parents of his future wife, Debbie. Boteach met her when he was 21 years old, and they married in Sydney in 1988. He then returned to New York, and took semicha (rabbinical ordination) in 1988.

By 2019, Boteach and his Australian wife Debbie had nine children; six of them were born in England. They resided in Englewood, New Jersey.

Rabbinic career
In 1988, Boteach was sent at age 22 by Rabbi Menachem Mendel Schneerson, known as "the Rebbe", as a Chabad-Lubavitch shaliach (emissary) to Oxford, England, where he served as rabbi to Oxford University's students for 11 years. During that time, he founded the Oxford University L'Chaim Society (in Hebrew, L'Chaim means "To Life"). The society grew to be the second-biggest student organization ever in Oxford, with a membership that included over 5,000 non-Jews. It attracted star speakers from politics, arts, and culture, including six Israeli prime ministers, former Australian prime minister Bob Hawke, former Soviet Union leader Mikhail Gorbachev, theoretical physicist Stephen Hawking, singer Boy George, football player Diego Maradona, and actor Jon Voight.

The society's members included American Rhodes Scholar, and future US Senator, Cory Booker (a Baptist) serving as the group's co-president, Italian journalist and future United Nations official Maurizio Giuliano serving as speaker coordinator and treasurer, and American doctoral student, and future president of Coastal Carolina University, Michael Benson (a Mormon) also serving as an officer of the society. Future Mayor of Los Angeles Eric Garcetti was also a member of the society. Some Orthodox patrons became concerned about the percentage of non-Jewish members, and after Rabbi Menachem Mendel Schneerson died in 1994, Chabad UK leadership asked Boteach to remove non-Jewish students from the society; others wanted Boteach to exclude gay students. Boteach refused on both counts, saying the Rebbe had loved non-Jews and regularly reached out to them; Boteach then changed the L'Chaim Society from a student society into an independent organization.

Later in 1994, after Boteach refused to cancel a speaking event featuring Israeli Prime Minister Yitzhak Rabin, he and Chabad split over the issue. Lubavitch leadership objected to the Prime Minister speaking, because Rabbi Schneerson before he died had opposed Rabin's peace deal proposal. After Boteach defied the suspension order, he was summoned to attend a beth din hearing at the Lubavitch World Headquarters. Boteach later confirmed that he was involuntarily terminated by Chabad—but said he still loved Chabad, and was raising his children in the Chabad tradition.

Excerpts from his best seller Kosher Sex were serialized in Playboy in 1998.  Boteach at the time was the leader of Shabbat services at an Orthodox Willesden synagogue in north London, where attendance had more than doubled after his arrival. He resigned from his role at the synagogue. While he had received the support of England's Chief Rabbi, whose office issued a statement saying Boteach was an "imaginative talent...  prepared to take risks in order to communicate an authentic Jewish message to a new generation," Boteach  wanted to "spare Chief Rabbi Jonathan Sacks problems with his rabbinate and the London Beit Din" according to media reports.

In 1999, the British government's Charity Commission raised concerns over payments made by the L'Chaim Society. In September, the Charity Commission temporarily froze the Society's bank accounts as a "temporary and protective measure", citing concerns about "the application and control" of the charity's funds -- however, the Charity Commission released the funds three months later, in December. The Society had made payments on a north London home in which Boteach lived.  L’Chaim Society officials explained that the payments had been made only after the Society had consulted with and followed the legal advice of charity experts at a top London law firm. The rabbi said: "This is a totally normal process in the United States." In the immediate wake of the announcement, he was banned from speaking at the New West End Synagogue by Chief Rabbi Sacks. The Charity Commission later found no evidence of wrongdoing, but determined that the mortgage payments were "difficult, if not impossible, to justify" under British law.  Boteach reportedly repaid the £150,000 to the trustees, and the issue was resolved with Boteach being cleared.

In 2000, Boteach won the "Preacher of the Year" Award, out of all faiths in Britain, from The Times in London.  The Jewish Chronicle described him as "the United Kingdom's most high-profile rabbi".  Boteach was listed in the top 10 on Newsweeks "Top 50 Rabbis in America" in 2007 (when it described him as "the most famous rabbi in America"), ninth in 2008, seventh in 2009, and sixth in 2010.  The Washington Post referred to him as "the most famous rabbi in America," and The Jerusalem Post named him one of the 50 most influential Jews in the world.

In 2013, Boteach was the commencement speaker for Southern Utah University, which granted him an honorary Doctor of Humane Letters degree.

He has attracted both praise and criticism from fellow rabbis during his career. For example, after the release of his book Kosher Jesus, Rabbi Israel Zoberman wrote that Boteach "offers a well-written scholarly volume that is far from dry and is accessible to all, one that both honors and is critical of [Christians and Jews]," and Israeli-American Rabbi Yechiel Eckstein, of the International Fellowship of Christians and Jews praised it as "courageous and thought-provoking". Similarly, Rabbi Michael Leo Samuel, while noting what Boteach could have added to his book to deepen it, concluded that it was a bold book and that he admired the courage of a Hassidic rabbi wishing: "to talk about Jesus in a manner that is respectful and kind. This is quite a rarity—especially when you consider the animus that most Hassidic and Haredi Jews feel toward Jesus.... All in all I admire his ...  willingness to talk about a subject that has remained a forbidden topic of discussion in Jewish circles of all denominations... one can argue that Shmuley's Kosher Jesus should serve as a meaningful first step for many Jews wishing to promote a more truthful and meaningful dialogue with the Christian community." But in contrast, 
Jacob Immanuel Schochet, a Canadian Orthodox Chabad-Lubavitch rabbi, was fiercely critical, deeming the book to be heretical and asserting that it "poses a tremendous risk to the Jewish community," and saying that "it is forbidden for anyone to buy or read this book," and it "does more to enhance the evangelical missionary message" than any other book. A Chicago Chabad rabbi—who admitted that he had only read the title of the book—wrote an op-ed in which he asserted on that basis alone that the book was apikorus (heresy) and must be treated as such. In reaction, Australian Orthodox Chabad Rabbi Moshe Gutnick, while agreeing with some of what Boteach said and disagreeing with other points, wrote: "The suggestion that [Boteach] is a heretic is simply ludicrous". Rabbi Michael Samuel of Temple Beth Sholom in Chula Vista, California, opined: "Lubavitchers do not want to know anything about Jesus." Boteach, for his part, said: "We are the People of the Book. We aren't the people who ban books."

Boteach is noted for his flamboyance and self-promotion. In an article in The Atlantic, Jeffrey Goldberg referred to him as the "Baal Shem Tov of self-promotion". While promoting his book at the Cheltenham Literature Festival, explaining why he was there he said: "God gave 10 commandments at Sinai, and the 11th commandment, which they expunged but which has come down orally, is 'Thou shalt do anything for publicity and recognition.'" He later described the comment as merely a sarcastic remark.

Media career

In 2006 and 2007, Boteach hosted the one-hour prime time television series Shalom in the Home. The series, which ran for two seasons on the TLC network, was a reality show in which Boteach counseled dysfunctional families and gave advice to struggling couples about their relationships and parenting. Shalom in the Home attracted almost 700,000 viewers per episode, and was one of the cable network's highest-rated shows. In 2007 he wrote a book with the same name, based on the TV series. That year, The National Fatherhood Initiative gave him its highest award for his efforts in the television series.  After the series ended, Boteach remained in contact with the families, counseling them, and having them over to his home. In 2022, the Jewish Journal named Boteach one of "The Top 10 Jewish Reality TV Stars of All Time."

In 2014, Boteach was featured in an episode of the Sundance Channel's Dream School reality television series. It was a non-fiction original series, which introduced troubled teen high school dropouts to mentors, in order to inspire the teenagers to turn their lives around.

On television, he has also made guest appearances on The Oprah Winfrey Show, The Dr. Phil Show, Larry King Live, Dateline NBC, The Today Show, The Howard Stern Show, The View, The O'Reilly Factor, and The Dr. Oz Show.

On radio, Boteach hosted a weekly nationally syndicated radio program on WABC called The Shmuley Show. It aired on Sunday evenings from 7-9 p.m. He was also host of his own daily talk radio show on the "Oprah and Friends" network on her XM radio channel.

Boteach has written syndicated columns for both The Huffington Post and The Jerusalem Post. He is also an op-ed contributor to The Wall Street Journal, The Washington Post, and other newspapers.

In March 2000, Boteach entered into an agreement with MatchNet (the creator of online dating site Jdate) to become its spokesman for three years, for an annual salary and stock options. After its initial public offering, the company sought to renegotiate his contract at a lower salary. According to his lawsuit, when he refused to renegotiate his agreement he was terminated right before his stock options vested. He claimed that MatchNet hired him to add legitimacy to its public offering, but never intended to fulfill its promises.

Michael Jackson
In the late 1990s, Boteach became a friend, close confidant, and unofficial spiritual advisor to singer Michael Jackson. Jackson and his children joined the Boteach family at their home on many Friday nights for Sabbath dinner, and Jackson  gave the family a dog as a present. Boteach was a vocal supporter of Jackson and was initially  "dismissive of suggestions that Jackson's relationships with children have been anything other than wholesome. "Why would anyone believe those charges? They said anyone who spends that amount of time with kids has to be sick. Well, that's not an indictment of Michael Jackson, that's an indictment of our society!" He said further: "I was friendly with Michael for a year before anyone knew about it. I did my own investigation. He never had sex with the child he made the settlement with, and there are no others."

Boteach served as president for the Heal the Kids offshoot (established by Boteach and Jackson in 2000) of the Heal the World Foundation charity founded by Jackson to encourage parents to spend more time with their children, and to help children threatened by war and disease by providing them with medicine and food. Jackson said: "Our goal is simple: to recreate the parent-child bond, renew its promise, and light the way forward for all the beautiful children who are destined one day to walk this earth." Heal the Kids was linked to the L'Chaim Society. Gossip blogger Roger Friedman claimed that donations to Heal the Kids were actually going to L’Chaim Society, and that Denise Rich who donated $100,000 by check to the L'Chaim Society was unaware that the funds would go to Boteach's organization; Rich declined to comment. Responding to the claims, Boteach accused Friedman, who was fired from Fox News in 2009, of holding a bias against Jackson, and having poor journalism ethics, saying: "Roger Friedman is the foremost Michael Jackson hater on planet earth. He was fired by Fox News for being an unscrupulous reporter."

Boteach later disavowed his relationship with Jackson. The two had a falling-out in 2002, after Jackson did not stick to the recovery programs they had worked out, which included his waking up at a reasonable hour and not being alone with children other than Jackson's own kids, and after Jackson's second arrest on charges of sexually abusing a child. Jackson reportedly kept an "enemy list" after their relationship ended on which Boteach appeared, along with Uri Geller, Gloria Allred, Tommy Mottola, Tom Sneddon, and Janet Arvizo.

After Jackson died of acute propofol intoxication in 2009, Boteach published The Michael Jackson Tapes. The book was drawn from 30 hours of interviews Boteach had with Jackson that were taped with Jackson's approval, and that Jackson intended to be for a book. In the tapes, Jackson spoke of his childhood scars and demanding father, the price of fame, his friendships with Madonna and Brooke Shields, married life, his relationship with children, his shyness, his fear of growing old, spirituality, and racism. Boteach wrote in the prologue: "This book is being published because it was Michael Jackson's desperate wish that it be so". Vibe wrote: "It's perhaps Michael's most lucid look at the man in the mirror," and The San Diego Tribune wrote: "The Michael Jackson Tapes breaks little in the way of new ground but the book ... provides firsthand detail about the performer's excesses and obsessions." At the same time, the publication was criticized by Nathan Rabin, writing for The A.V. Club, who opined that the book was the "worst kind of posthumous cash-in". Boteach published a second related book in 2010, entitled: Honoring the Child Spirit: Inspiration and Learning from Our Children, in conversation with Michael Jackson.

The World Values Network and Israel activism 
Boteach is the founder and executive director of The World Values Network (also known as "This World: The Values Network"), a Jewish pro-Israel non-profit organization that he established in 2007. The mission of the organization is to "disseminate universal Jewish values in politics, culture, and media".

The organization holds an annual Champions of Jewish Values International Awards gala. The gala has honored Senators Cory Booker (D) and Ted Cruz (R), Representatives Ron DeSantis (R; now a Governor), Tulsi Gabbard (D), and Ed Royce (R), Ambassadors Ron Dermer, David M. Friedman, and Georgette Mosbacher, television personalities Steve Harvey, Caitlyn Jenner (also a former Olympic gold medalist), Dr. Oz, and Judge Jeanine Pirro, actors Pamela Anderson, Ben Kingsley, Sean Penn, Geza Rohrig, and Jon Voight,  journalists Ken Kurson and Bret Stephens (a Pulitzer Prize winner), Dr. Miriam Adelson and businessman Sheldon G. Adelson, Hatzalah founder Eli Beer, Miss Israel Adar Gandelsman, former heavyweight champion of the world boxer Evander Holyfield, President Kagame of Rwanda, Reverend Bernice King, U.S. Secretary of the Treasury Steve Mnuchin, Member of the Knesset Amir Ohana, musician and activist Yoko Ono, Crown Prince of Iran Reza Pahlavi, human rights activist John Prendergast, businessman Robert F. Smith, White House Press Secretary Sean Spicer, singer Dionne Warwick, Nobel Prize winning author Elie Wiesel, and others who have promoted Israel and Jewish values.

The organization collects donations and  has funded newspaper advertisements to draw attention to anti-Semitism and to anti-Israel bias. It has placed ads in opposition to Hamas, Secretary of State John Kerry's work towards the 2015 Iran nuclear deal, Congresswoman Rashida Tlaib's comments on Holocaust Remembrance Day, Natalie Portman for canceling an appearance at an award ceremony in Israel, and U.S. Representative Ilhan Omar for anti-Semitic remarks.

In 2015, US National Security Advisor Susan Rice criticized Israeli Prime Minister Benjamin Netanyahu for agreeing to speak to Congress about Iran's nuclear program without coordinating with the Obama administration. The World Values Network placed an ad in The New York Times in response that read "Susan Rice has a blind spot: Genocide", and said that her action had "injected a degree of partisanship" that is "destructive of the fabric of the relationship" between the US and Israel. The ad faced widespread criticism by Jewish organizations.  Boteach apologized, saying that the disagreement was over policy, and he did not intend to make a personal attack. Speaking to CNN, he said the purpose of the ad was to bring attention to his perception that the United States government has ignored genocides in the past, and continues to do so.

In 2018, New Zealand singer Lorde cancelled a Tel Aviv concert in support of the Boycott, Divestment, and Sanctions movement. The World Values Network placed an ad in response, calling her a “bigot”. The criticism was one of several denunciations from well-known Israelis and Zionist leaders of her cancellation, and the Zionist Federation of New Zealand and the Jewish Council of New Zealand were also critical of her, though the ad itself was met with a distancing by the council.

On May 23, 2021, the organization ran a full-page New York Times ad calling on Dua Lipa, and Gigi and Bella Hadid, to condemn Hamas, because the terror group "calls for a second Holocaust" (quoting Article 7 of the Hamas Charter, which advocates that Moslems kill Jews). The ad also pointed to Lipa and Bella Hadid accusing Israel of "ethnic cleansing", even as Jewish refugees were "savagely forced out of every Arab land, and Jews living in pre-state Israel ... were subjected to multiple Arab massacres and pogroms," and accused them of anti-Semitism for having "vilified the Jewish state". He called for them to consider condemning Hamas for its brutality toward women, tolerance for honor killings of young Palestinian girls, use of children as human shields for military stockpiles and rocket launch-pads, murders of LGBTQ Palestinians, and avoidance of fair elections "after fourteen autocratic years." Lipa rejected what she characterized as "the false and appalling allegations" and said that WVN used her name "shamelessly" to "advance their ugly campaign with falsehoods and blatant misrepresentations." Stop Antisemitism tweeted to Lipa in response: "Remember that [Instagram] story you shared calling Israelis ‘fake Jews’, and Hamas being an Israeli invention?  We didn't... you're a pathetic liar."

The New York Daily News reported on the organization's tax filing in 2009, two years after the organization's founding, and noted that it raised $651,000, and paid $638,000 in operating and administrative expenses combined (including a $229,000 salary for Boteach—up from $59,000 the prior year, and $70,000 in charitable disbursements). The organization paid Boteach a director salary of $330,371 in 2015. In 2018, Charity Navigator, a charity assessment organization that evaluates charitable organizations in the United States, evaluated the stability, efficiency, sustainability, accountability, and transparency policies of World Values Network to measure the charity's good governance and integrity, and gave World Values Network a score of 100 out of 100. At the time World Values Network had $1.3 million in total revenue, 76.11% of its revenue in 2016-18 was spent on program expenses (for a passing score, Charity Navigator looks for a ratio of 70% or more), only 22.9% on administrative expenses (Charity Navigator looks for administrative expenses to be under 30%), three of its four board of director members were independent (Charity Navigator looks for at least 50% independent directors), and it had an annual independent audit.

Views

Marriage

In his 2014 book Kosher Lust, Boteach said that lust, rather than love, is the glue to a healthy marriage. The book's subtitle is "Love is not the Answer". He believes married couples should focus on having a strong sexual connection. Boteach writes of three "pillars of lust" that he believes ensure an exciting marriage: unavailability ("Eros thrives in the shadows"), mystery (keeping some things private), and sinfulness (being novel and risqué in couples' sex lives; "anything that makes you more hooked" is permissible in the bedroom). He expands upon his view, saying that the essence of lust is desire. "I want you; I can't live without you; my life is empty without you; I will forsake everything for you — the intensity, that passion. And I don't just mean physical lust, like lust for the body, because that wanes... I mean the natural gravitation of two energies — masculine to feminine, feminine to masculine." He also opines that of course one needs "respect, appreciation, compliments, shared values." But says that if one is in a marriage where one doesn't deeply desire the other person, "you are in a jail cell. It's a form of incarceration."

He also says that the essence of lust and desire is "chosen," and that a woman - in particular - wants to feel chosen.  He in addition is of the view that when men don't speak to their wives, which happens for a variety of reasons, that causes their wives to feel a great deal of pain.

As to underpinnings of his views in Judaism, Boteach opines that all of the notable marriages in the Bible are lust relationships, rather than love relationships. He points out that Jacob waits seven years for Rachel but for Jacob it feels like just a few days, and that the first thing Rebecca does when she meets Isaac is put a veil over her face."

He also points to the Bible's Song of Solomon, a poem that describes the yearning of a man for a woman: "Your breasts are like two fawns, like twin fawns of a gazelle that browse among the lilies... Your stature is like that of the palm, and your breasts like clusters of fruit. I said, 'I will climb the palm tree; I will take hold of its fruit'."  He wrote that it is part of Jewish Talmudic law that a man must ensure that his wife reaches orgasm before he does.

Sex
Boteach's book Kosher Sex: A Recipe for Passion and Intimacy (1988) was a best seller. The Washington Post referred to him as "Dr. Ruth with a yarmulke," and the British media called the book the "kosher Kamasutra". He opined: "Only sex has the capacity to bring in its wake an overwhelming tidal wave of positive emotion which makes us feel intensely good about each other ... which conversation can't do, which friendship can't do, which shared experiences can't do." He is also of the view that while one does not have to be religious to love sex, it helps, and while one does not have to be married to have great sex, it helps. He opined: "Couples should have the dirtiest sex where they can't control themselves, where the beast within is awakened. That's what passion is all about. In order to have that, you need a modest exterior. That is eroticism." To achieve that, he is in favor of anything that fans the spark between a married couple, including (when he is asked) oral sex and sex toys. At the same time, because he believes they distract or dull one's sexual edge, he is against the lights being on and masturbation. He is also of the view that we should refrain from sex before marriage, because it's bad sex.

After Kosher Sex was excerpted in Playboy, Boteach received two tickets in the mail for a big party at the Playboy Mansion, but his wife wagged her fingers at him and said: "No bunnies for you." Backstage at The Today Show, he ran into former U.S. Secretary of State Henry Kissinger, who asked for a signed copy of the book.  At the same time, the book caused a stir in the Orthodox community—even so, in the summer of 2012 it was the most checked-out non-fiction book in Crown Heights, Brooklyn, which houses the center for Chabad Jewry in America.

One of the rabbi's daughters, Chana Boteach, followed up on her father's theme years later. In 2019 when she was 28 years old she opened a boutique Kosher Sex shop in Tel Aviv (subsequently, she opened one in Jerusalem), and also began selling its products online. Kosher Sex sells items such as blindfolds, silk handcuffs, feathers, body jewelry, candles, nipple tassels, perfumes, oils, and vibrators. There are also games, in which couples toss dice and receive instructions as to what to do next. On the other hand, she also has boxes with Shabbat candles, which she hands out to women to encourage them to light candles on Friday night. She opined: "Nothing is vulgar." She calls the boutiques Kosher Sex because the purpose of the toys is to "help married couples create intimacy in a relationship.... People marry and stay in a relationship for a long time. Aids can help people spice things up between them.... You need to rediscover intimacy between two people, and to do that you must learn something new all the time, and these aids can help you do that." Asked whether she worried about getting rabbinic approval, she laughed and said: "My dad's a rabbi. I'll take his approval."

Homosexuality 
Boteach wrote in a 2010 Wall Street Journal op-ed column on homosexuality that he does not deny that there is a biblical prohibition on male same-sex relationships, and a commandment for men and women to marry and have children. Still, he understands those in context. "There are 613 commandments in the Torah... So when Jewish gay couples tell me they have never been attracted to members of the opposite sex and are desperate alone, I tell them "You have 611 commandments left. That should keep you busy. Now, go create a kosher home ... you are His beloved children." Five years later he wrote that he believed in the equality of all of God's children, and has seen too much homophobia in his life.  He believes that the biggest threat to marriage doesn't come from gay marriage, but heterosexual divorce, which he says afflicts half of marriages. He opposes government involvement at all in recognizing marriage, but supports state-sanctioned "civil unions" for all.

Coronavirus

Speaking about the COVID-19 pandemic, Boteach said "I utterly reject and find it sickening when people believe that this is some kind of punishment from God - that really upsets me." He also said that he found it: "very upsetting when religious leaders don't shut down their synagogues, churches, or mosques because they believe that prayer is more important than preserving life." At the same time, as his father died during the pandemic and his brother became sick with Covid, he wrote about the difficulty of dealing with those tragedies during the pandemic.

Outreach to non-Jews 
In 2008, he debated Douglas Jacoby and Shabir Ally, on The True Legacy of Abraham, and the next year he debated Douglas Jacoby on "Judaism & Christianity: Which is the Religion of Peace?" In 2008, he debated Michael Brown, a leader of the Messianic Jews, on whether belief in Jesus is compatible with Judaism, and in his book Kosher Jesus he depicts Jesus as "a Jewish patriot murdered by Rome for his struggle on behalf of his people." These positions drew opposition from Yitzchak Schochet, a British rabbi who was a rival of Boteach's, who called Boteach's attempts to reach out to Messianic Jews "self-delusional".  Boteach is also of the view that while the Chabad movement's objective is to serve all Jews, its philosophy also extends to helping others become stronger in their respective religions.

Jesus
In his 2012 book Kosher Jesus, Boteach takes the position that Jesus was a wise and learned Torah-observant Jewish rabbi, and a beloved member of the Jewish community. At the same time, he writes Jesus despised the Romans for their cruelty, and fought them courageously. He states that the Jews had nothing whatsoever to do with the murder of Jesus, but rather that blame for his trial and killing lies with the Romans and Pontius Pilate. Boteach states clearly that he does not believe in Jesus as the Jewish Messiah. At the same time, Boteach argues that "Jews have much to learn from Jesus - and from Christianity as a whole - without accepting Jesus' divinity. There are many reasons for accepting Jesus as a man of great wisdom, beautiful ethical teachings, and profound Jewish patriotism."  He concludes by writing, as to Judeo-Christian values, that "the hyphen between Jewish and Christian values is Jesus himself."

Israel 
Boteach is supportive of Israel. He was critical of Obama-era American policy towards the country. Boteach argued that the Obama administration bullied Israel, and  that U.S. Middle Eastern policy was "scandalous" and "disgusting". He is also supportive of Israeli settlements, including the Hebron settlement, the residents of which he characterizes as marked by a particular "warmth, friendliness and hospitality" and views as being "liberated from hatred". He also noted that the Jewish residents of Hebron are derisively described "as settlers — as if Jews living in their own ancient capital are newcomers."  He was supportive of President Trump's Israel policies, and called him "the most pro-Israel president in history".

Two of his children had served as soldiers in the Israel Defense Forces.

Male circumcision 
Boteach has argued in favor of infant male circumcision, defending the practice on religious grounds and health grounds, while contrasting it sharply with female circumcision. He said that to compare the excising of a male foreskin with the removal of a female clitoris is a lie, as "female circumcision is all about removing a woman's ability to experience pleasure during sex, and is a barbarous act of mutilation that has no corollary to its male counterpart." He said that "Judaism celebrates the sexual, intimate and erotic bond between husband and wife, and attempts to portray circumcision as a method of denying a man's sexual pleasure are ignorant."

He has also advocated in 2011 for the medical benefits of male circumcision reducing the transmission and incidence of HIV-AIDS, other STDs such as genital herpes and syphilis, urinary-tract infections, penile cancer, and other adverse health conditions, pointing to a report in the British Medical Journal .

Discussing New Testament mention of male circumcision, Boteach noted that when Jesus is criticized for healing a crippled man on the Sabbath (John 5:1-47), Jesus quotes a legal precedent preserved later in the Talmud (Tractate Yoma) to prove that his action is justified, saying: "Now if a boy can be circumcised on the Sabbath so that the Law of Moses may not be broken, why are you angry with me for healing a man's whole body on the Sabbath?" (7:23 NIV).

Boteach has written op-eds in The Wall Street Journal and the Huffington Post denouncing legislation to limit male circumcision. The issue of the appropriateness of male circumcision remains a hotly debated topic.

Pornography 
Boteach has been critical of pornography. In 2016, he co-authored a viral Wall Street Journal opinion piece with actress and former Playboy model Pamela Anderson, in which they called online pornography a "public hazard of unprecedented seriousness". The two called for a "sensual revolution" to replace "pornography with eroticism, the alloying of sex with love, of physicality with personality, of the body's mechanics with imagination, of orgasmic release with binding relationships." They later gave a joint lecture at Oxford University to over 1,000 people. Boteach observed: "It can be intimidating to talk about pornography and eroticism alongside an international sex symbol, but I think Pamela has handled it extremely well." The two also wrote a book together, Lust for Love (2018), about how meaningful, passionate sex has been declining, and calling for a new sensual revolution that emphasizes partners connecting in the bedroom. In 2001, he publicly debated pornography with  Jewish Playmate Lindsey Vuolo.

Racism and antisemitism

In December 2022, taking a stand against increasing instances of racism and antisemitism in the United States, Boteach, Reverends Al Sharpton and Conrad Tillard, New York City Mayor Eric Adams, businessman and Carnegie Hall Chairman Robert F. Smith, and Elisha Wiesel joined to host 15 Days of Light, celebrating Hanukkah and Kwanzaa in a unifying holiday ceremony at Carnegie Hall.  Boteach said: "This is the way it should be. Blacks and Jews united to promote human dignity and fight the haters."

2012 Congressional run
Boteach, a self-described social moderate, ran for the U.S. House of Representatives in northern New Jersey in the 2012 elections. He became the first rabbi ever to run for the U.S. Congress as a Republican, and had he won he would have been the first rabbi in Congress. Referring to the 50% divorce rate in the United States as "an American tragedy that no one talks about," he supported making marriage and family counseling tax-deductible to help strengthen marriages and lower the nation's divorce rate. He also supported a federal school voucher system, lower taxes, a flat tax and simplification of the tax code, smaller government, and preventing Iran from building a nuclear weapon. He was staunchly pro-Israel, and anti-terrorism and Hamas. He received the endorsement of then-House Majority Leader Eric Cantor (R-Va.).

Boteach won the Republican primary for New Jersey's 9th congressional district seat in a three-way race on June 5. He received 57.9% of the vote, defeating Hector Castillo with 28.3% of the vote, and Blase Billack with 13.8% of the vote.

In the November general election he faced eight-term Democratic 8th District Representative and former mayor of Paterson, New Jersey, Bill Pascrell. Boteach gave a $250 donation to his opponent, because he wanted them to have a Friday night Shabbat dinner date together at his home to get to know each other as people before they were opponents, and he was hoping his donation would get Pascrell's attention after several unsuccessful attempts to arrange the dinner. Pascrell raised more money than any other congressional candidate in the state in 2012, $2.6 million, 10x what Boteach raised. Boteach lost in the overwhelmingly Democratic district, where Democrats outnumbered Republicans by 3-to-1, by a margin of 73.6% to 25.4%. In his concession speech Boteach said: "He is now my Congressman. I pledge my complete support to him."

Selected bibliography

References

External links
 
Archive version of 2012 campaign website
 
 
 Ruth Gledhill (2000) "The Sabbath; Sermon Preached by Rabbi Shmuley Boteach in Oxford in February 1999", Fifth Times Book of Best Sermons, A&C Black, 
 Shmuley Boteach (November 17, 2011). "How Divorce Scars Children; I do not believe that couples ought to stay together for the sake of the children. Marriage is not a prison sentence; children are not your jailers. But that does not mean that divorce does not scar kids," The Huffington Post.
 Shmuley Boteach (February 3, 2014). "Lessons for Israel-on-campus from Scarlett Johansson," The Jerusalem Post.
 Shmuley Boteach (July 3, 2016). "My last night with Elie Wiesel," The Jerusalem Post.
 Shmuley Boteach (October 23, 2017). "Today's Germans are not responsible for the Holocaust," The Jerusalem Post.
 Shmuley Boteach (July 15, 2019). "Orthodox Jews must not demonize gays," The Jerusalem Post.
 Shmuley Boteach (May 18, 2020).  "Coronavirus dating demands everyone become a matchmaker", The Jerusalem Post.
 Shmuley Boteach (October 14, 2020). "What was God thinking with the coronavirus?", The Jerusalem Post.

1966 births
Living people
20th-century American non-fiction writers
21st-century American non-fiction writers
20th-century American rabbis
21st-century American rabbis
Activists against antisemitism
American Haredi rabbis
American Orthodox rabbis
American people of Iranian-Jewish descent
American relationships and sexuality writers
American sex educators
American talk radio hosts
American Zionists
Anti-pornography activists
American anti-racism activists
Candidates in the 2012 United States elections
Chabad-Lubavitch emissaries
Chabad-Lubavitch rabbis
Circumcision debate
Jesus in Judaism
Jewish American people in New Jersey politics
Jewish American writers
Judaism and sexuality
Male television personalities
Marriage in Judaism
New Jersey Republicans
People associated with the University of Oxford
People from Englewood, New Jersey
Politicians from Los Angeles
Politicians from Miami
Rabbis from Los Angeles
Rabbis from New Jersey
Radio personalities from Los Angeles
Radio personalities from Miami
Radio personalities from New Jersey
Television personalities from Florida
Television personalities from Los Angeles
Writers from Los Angeles
Writers from Miami
Writers from New Jersey
20th-century English rabbis